Abhinikmana is a 2013 Sri Lankan Sinhala spiritual drama film directed by Hector Kumarasiri and produced by Nimal Chandrasiri for Vas Media Films. It stars Sudarshana Bandara and Lochana Imashi in lead roles along with Mahendra Perera, Joe Abeywickrama and Iranganie Serasinghe. Music composed by Nimantha Heshan. It is the 1187th Sri Lankan film in the Sinhala cinema. 

The film recorded as the final film acting of cinema legend Joe Abeywickrama.

Cast
 Sudarshana Bandara as Buddhadasa 'Budhadasi Hamudurwo'
 Lochana Imashi as Seedevi
 Mahendra Perera as Somadasa
 Iranganie Serasinghe as Buddhadasa's Amma
 Joe Abeywickrama as Buddhadasa's Thatha
 W. Jayasiri as Chief monk
 Manohari Wimalathunga as Veda Hamine
 Jeevan Handunnetti as Dancing Mama
 Premadasa Vithanage as Upasaka Appu

References

2013 films
2010s Sinhala-language films
2013 drama films
Sri Lankan drama films